Thomas Raven Ackroyd (7 August 1861 – 26 April 1946) was an English bank manager and Liberal Party politician.

Family and education 

Ackroyd was the son of William and Elizabeth Ackroyd. He attended Chancery Lane, Wesleyan School in Manchester and the Manchester Mechanics’ Institute. He attended Manchester University as an evening student. Later in life he was awarded the honorary degree of MA from Manchester. He married Emily Woffenden in 1893. They had a least one son, Charles Winstanley Ackroyd, born in 1894 who emigrated to Australia in 1916 and served in the armed forces, being killed in action in October 1917. In religion Ackroyd was a prominent member of the Wesleyan Methodist Church and acted as a lay preacher.

Career
Ackroyd went into banking. In 1878 he entered service as a junior clerk in the Union Bank of Manchester.  He ended up as a bank manager. He also served as a Justice of the Peace.  He retired from banking to devote himself to social and educational work on behalf of neglected children.

Politics and public life

Public life

Ackroyd took an active part in the religious and social life of the city of Manchester. He was Chairman of the Manchester and Salford Ragged School Union and Chairman (for 1924) of the Shaftesbury Society, founded by Lord Shaftesbury and of the London Ragged School Union. Ackroyd also served for a time as Chairman of the Executive Committee of the Lancashire and Cheshire YMCA.

Local and regional politics

Ackroyd was also involved in  Manchester politics, being a member, later an Alderman of the City Council. He also acted as representative for Lancashire  and for Lancashire and Cheshire on the National Liberal Federation.

Parliament

He first stood for Parliament at the 1922 general election, as Liberal candidate in Manchester Moss Side. He came second to the sitting Conservative MP, Gerald Berkeley Hurst in a three-cornered contest with Labour’s T W Mercer in third.

He was again the candidate in 1923 when Liberal reunion improved his prospects. This time Labour did not intervene and, although there was an Independent candidate (who lost his deposit), Ackroyd took the seat from Hurst with a majority of 3,113 votes.

By 1924 however the Tory Party had revived and in a straight fight with Hurst, Ackroyd lost his seat by a majority of 4,009. He tried to regain the seat in 1929 but in a three-cornered contest with Hurst and Labour candidate A A Purcell, he came third. He did not attempt to re-enter the House of Commons again.

Death
Ackroyd died on 26 April 1946 aged 84 years.

References

External links 
 

1861 births
1946 deaths
English bankers
English Methodists
UK MPs 1923–1924
Liberal Party (UK) MPs for English constituencies
Politicians from Manchester
YMCA leaders